Shartaq-e Do (also Romanized as Shartāq Do and Shartāq-e Do; also known as Sharţāq) is a village in Jahad Rural District, Hamidiyeh District, Ahvaz County, Khuzestan Province, Iran. At the 2006 census, its population was 250, in 42 families.

References 

Populated places in Ahvaz County